Ye Zhiping (1953 – June 27, 2011) was the principal of Sangzao Middle School in An County, Sichuan, People's Republic of China, noteworthy for saving thousands of his students. 

Concerned over the structural integrity of school buildings, especially when facing an earthquake, he undertook special measures, collecting funds to strengthen existing structures. As a result, during the 2008 Sichuan earthquake all 2,323 students emerged unharmed. This was in stark contrast to many other school buildings, which took disproportionate damage compared to other buildings, leading to heavy criticism of government standards for educational facilities, and even allegations of corruption in the construction of Chinese schools.

He died in Chengdu on 27 June 2011 aged 57 after suffering a cerebral haemorrhage.

References

"A Chinese school, shored up by its principal, survived where others fell", IHT, June 15, 2008
"How Angel of Sichuan Saved School in Quake", New York Times, June 16, 2008
"'Angel of Sichuan' hailed for saving pupils", Taipei Times, June 17, 2008

1953 births
Living people
People from Mianyang
Educators from Sichuan